Martin Wilhelm Kutta (3 November 1867 – 25 December 1944) was a German mathematician.

Kutta was born in Pitschen, Upper Silesia (today Byczyna, Poland). He attended the University of Breslau from 1885 to 1890, and continued his studies in Munich until 1894, where he became the assistant of Walther Franz Anton von Dyck. From 1898, he spent half a year at the University of Cambridge. From 1899 to 1909 he worked again as an assistant of von Dyck in Munich; from 1909 to 1910 he was adjunct professor at the Friedrich Schiller University Jena. He was professor at the RWTH Aachen from 1910 to 1912.  Kutta became professor at the University of Stuttgart in 1912, where he stayed until his retirement in 1935.

In 1901, he co-developed the Runge–Kutta method, used to solve ordinary differential equations numerically. He is also remembered for the Zhukovsky–Kutta aerofoil, the Kutta–Zhukovsky theorem and the Kutta condition in aerodynamics. 
Kutta died in Fürstenfeldbruck, Germany in 1944.

References

External links

1867 births
1944 deaths
19th-century German mathematicians
20th-century German mathematicians
Numerical analysts
Aerodynamicists
People from the Province of Silesia
University of Breslau alumni
Academic staff of the University of Jena
Academic staff of the University of Stuttgart
Academic staff of RWTH Aachen University
Fluid dynamicists
People from Kluczbork County